Fredebal, also spelled as Fredbal or Fredbalus, was a king of the Vandals during the 5th century. 

King of the Siling Vandals, he was taken prisoner without any conflict in Baetica (416) by a trick of Wallia, king of the Visigoths, in the imperial service. Fredebal was sent to Roman Emperor Honorius in Ravenna.

References

Sources
 Hydatius 
 Chronicle of Fredegar

Kings of the Vandals
5th-century monarchs in Europe